Ian Miller (born 16 December 1949) is a former Australian rules footballer who played for Fitzroy in the VFL and with Perth and East Perth in the WANFL and appeared in 15 interstate matches for Western Australia.

Following the footsteps of his father Bob Miller who 172 games for Perth, Miller was a versatile player and was often used across half forward and as a ruck-rover. He started his career at WANFL club Perth and was a member of their 1968 premiership side. In 1972 he spent more of the season at centre half-forward and won a Sandover Medal. He also represented Western Australia that year at the Perth Carnival and earned All-Australian selection. The following season he played the last of his 132 games for Perth and was recruited by Fitzroy.

From 1974 to 1977 he was a regular in the Fitzroy side before returning to the West in 1978 to join East Perth. In his debut season for East Perth he starred in their two-point Grand Final victory, winning a Simpson Medal. He finished with 64 games at East Perth and from 1982 to 1984 was coach of Perth.

In 1999 was chosen as a half forward flanker in Perth's official 'Team of the Century'.

References

External links

1949 births
Living people
Fitzroy Football Club players
Perth Football Club players
East Perth Football Club players
Perth Football Club coaches
Sandover Medal winners
All-Australians (1953–1988)
Australian rules footballers from Western Australia
West Australian Football Hall of Fame inductees